Adenylyl cyclase 10 also known as ADCY10 is an enzyme that, in humans, is encoded by the ADCY10 gene.

Function 
The protein encoded by this gene belongs to a distinct class of mammalian adenylyl cyclase that is soluble and insensitive to G protein or forskolin regulation. It is localized in the cytoplasm and is thought to function as a general bicarbonate sensor throughout the body. It may also play an important role in the generation of cAMP in spermatozoa, implying possible roles in sperm maturation through the epididymis, capacitation, hypermotility, and/or the acrosome reaction.

Clinical significance 
Mutations in the ADCY10 gene are associated with an increased risk of adsorptive hypercalciuria and male infertility.

References

External links

Further reading 

 
 
 
 
 
 
 
 
 
 
 
 

EC 4.6.1